Francis Albert Sinatra & Antônio Carlos Jobim is a 1967 album by Frank Sinatra and Antônio Carlos Jobim. The tracks were arranged and conducted by Claus Ogerman, accompanied by a studio orchestra. Along with Jobim's original compositions, the album features three standards from the Great American Songbook, ("Change Partners", "I Concentrate on You", and "Baubles, Bangles and Beads") arranged in the bossa nova style.

Sinatra and Jobim followed up this album with sessions for a second collaboration, titled Sinatra-Jobim. That album was briefly released on 8-track tape (Reprise 8FH 1028) in 1969 before being taken out of print at Sinatra's behest, due to concerns over its sales potential. Several of the Sinatra-Jobim tracks were subsequently incorporated in the Sinatra & Company album (1971) and the Sinatra–Jobim Sessions compilation (1979). In 2010 the Concord Records label issued a new, comprehensive compilation titled Sinatra/Jobim: The Complete Reprise Recordings.

At the 10th Annual Grammy Awards in 1968, Francis Albert Sinatra & Antônio Carlos Jobim was nominated for the Grammy Award for Album of the Year, but lost to the Beatles Sgt. Pepper's Lonely Hearts Club Band. Sinatra had won the previous two Grammy awards for album of the year, in 1967 and 1966.

Jobim had to wait for Sinatra to return from a holiday in Barbados where he was taking a mutually agreed 'break' from his marriage to Mia Farrow.

Guitarist Al Viola played on "Change Partners" due to Jobim's difficulty with the track, but is not credited on the album. Lyricists  Aloysio de Oliveria and Ray Gilbert were also present at the sessions.

The album was recorded on January 30 and February 1, 1967, at United Western Recorders in Hollywood, Los Angeles. Later in the evening of February 1, Sinatra and his daughter, Nancy, recorded their single "Somethin' Stupid".

Track listing
"The Girl from Ipanema" (Antônio Carlos Jobim, Norman Gimbel, Vinícius de Moraes) – 3:00
"Dindi" (Ray Gilbert, Jobim, Aloysio de Oliveria) – 3:25
"Change Partners" (Irving Berlin) – 2:40
"Quiet Nights of Quiet Stars (Corcovado)" (Jobim, Gene Lees) – 2:45
"Meditation (Meditação)" (Jobim, Gimbel, Newton Mendonça) – 2:51
"If You Never Come to Me (Inútil Paisagem)" (Jobim, Gilbert, de Oliveira) – 2:10
"How Insensitive (Insensatez)" (Jobim, Gimbel, de Moraes) – 3:15
"I Concentrate on You" (Cole Porter) – 2:32
"Baubles, Bangles and Beads" (Robert C. Wright, George Forrest, Alexander Borodin) – 2:32
"Once I Loved (O Amor em Paz)" (Jobim, Gilbert, de Moraes) – 2:37

Personnel

Performance
 Frank Sinatra – vocal
 Antônio Carlos Jobim – piano, acoustic guitar, backing vocals
 Claus Ogerman – arranger, conductor
 Dom Um Romão – drums
 Colin Bailey - drums I Concentrate On You, Baubles Bangles And Beads, Change Partners, Dindi
 Al Viola – electric guitar
 Jose Marino – doublebass

Charts

References

1967 albums
Frank Sinatra albums
Antônio Carlos Jobim albums
Albums arranged by Claus Ogerman
Albums conducted by Claus Ogerman
Albums produced by Sonny Burke
Albums recorded at United Western Recorders
Portuguese-language albums
Reprise Records albums
Vocal duet albums